Nasrabad is a village in Howmeh Rural District, in the Central District of Khalilabad County, Razavi Khorasan Province, Iran. At the 2006 census, its population was 2,113, in 584 families.

References 

Populated places in Khalilabad County